102.3 Triple M (ACMA callsign: 4TOO) is an Australian radio station in Queensland. Owned and operated as part of Southern Cross Austereo's Triple M network, it broadcasts an adult contemporary format to Townsville, Queensland. First broadcast in 1931 on 1170 kHz AM, later 780 kHz, then became 774 kHz in the 1978 shakeup when all AM transmitters were shuffled into the 9 kHz spacing regime. 
In 1998 the station transferred to the FM band, under ownership of DMG Regional Radio later sold to Macquarie Regional RadioWorks and Southern Cross Media Group. The station broadcasts all North Queensland Cowboys NRL matches, and has previously networked music programming to the regional LocalWorks network.

In January 2015 the 774 kHz AM repeater was shut down, and in December 2015 the masts were demolished.

On 16 August 2016, a repeater was switched on from Mt Inkerman, south of Home Hill, covering the Burdekin region on 92.3 MHz.

On 3 September 2018, 4TOFM was rebranded to 102.3 Triple M.

Gallery

References

External links 

Radio stations in Queensland
Radio stations established in 1931
Adult contemporary radio stations in Australia
1931 establishments in Australia